Khandra College, is the Honours and General Degree College in Khandra,  in the Paschim Bardhaman district, West Bengal, India. It offers Undergraduate Courses in Arts, Commerce and Science. It is affiliated to  Kazi Nazrul University, Asansol. It was established in 1981.

Departments

Arts,Commerce and Science

English
Economics
Geography
Political Science
History
Mass Communication
Accountancy
Finance
Taxation
Physics
Chemistry
Zoology
Mathematics

Accreditation
The college is recognized by the University Grants Commission (UGC).

See also

References

External links
Khandra College
Kazi Nazrul University
University Grants Commission
National Assessment and Accreditation Council

Colleges affiliated to Kazi Nazrul University
Educational institutions established in 1981
Universities and colleges in Paschim Bardhaman district
1981 establishments in West Bengal